Miss Europe 1999, was 53rd edition of the Miss Europe pageant and 42nd under the Mondial Events Organization. It was held in Beirut, Lebanon on 25 June 1999. Yelena Rogozhina of Russia, was crowned Miss Europe 1999 by out going titleholder Isabelle Darras of Greece.

Results

Placements

Special awards

Contestants 

 - Venera Mustafa
 - Gohar Harutyunian
 - Magdalena Jamrozy
 - Svetlana Kruk
 - Alexandra Monteiro
 - Krastina Totkova
 - Tijana Safar
 - Carina Constantinidou
 - Jitka Kocurova
 - Maria Hjelmborg
 - Kadri Väljaots
 - Minna Lehtinen
 -  Pamela Semmache
 - Eka Tordia
 - Helene Löwenstein
 - Danielle Waller
 - Fei Georgakopoulou
 - Angčle du Bois
 - Erika Dankai
 - Katrín Rós Baldursdóttir
 - Claire McKenna
 - Cristina Cellai 
 - Anete Jurjane
 - Ieva Bieliauskaite
 - Ana Binovska
 - Janet Spiteri
 - Lilia Ciofu
 - Anette Rusten
 - Agnieszka Stolarczyk
 - Marisa Ferreira
 - Angela Tanase
 - Yelena Rogozhina
 - Dusana Fridrichova
 - Tatjana Tutan
 - Inmaculada Nadal González
 - Malin Jonsson
 - Tiziana Bölsterli 
 - Hulya Mutlu
 - Yuliya Zharkova

"Comité Officiel et International Miss Europe" Competition

From 1951 to 2002 there was a rival Miss Europe competition organized by the "Comité Officiel et International Miss Europe". This was founded in 1950 by Jean Raibaut in Paris, the headquarters later moved to Marseille. The winners wore different titles like Miss Europe, Miss Europa or Miss Europe International.

This year's competition took place at the Taormina Greek Theatre in Taormina, Sicily, Italy. There were 34 contestants from 12 countries. At the end, Anna Maria Tudorache of Romania was crowned as Miss Europa 1999. Tudorache succeeded her predecessor Mimmi Gunnarsson of Sweden.

Placements

Contestants

 - Aldona Elezi
 - Ana Maria Oproiu
 - Cristina Stan
 - Angela Lynn Smedley
 - Danielle Wall
 - Katie Vigers
 - Kishmiro Dickinson
 - Zara Baynes
 - Anu Pekkarinen
 - Jenni Ahola
 - Linda Kvalvaag
 - Jessica Stahl
 - Lilla Hartai
 - Szilvia Booli
 - Iveta Vanaga
 - Citianne Balzan
 - Alina Tautan
 - Anna Maria Tudorache
 - Simona Verestiuc
 - Eva Maria Blanco Games
 - Nadine Callus
 - Galina Lakhtina

References

External links 
 

Miss Europe
1999 beauty pageants
1999 in Lebanon
1999 in Italy
Beauty pageants in Lebanon